Rowley may refer to:

Places

Canada
 Rowley, Alberta
 Rowley Island, Nunavut

United Kingdom
 Rowley, County Durham, a hamlet
 Rowley, East Riding of Yorkshire, England
 Rowley, Shropshire, a location in Shropshire, England
 Rowley Regis, a historic parish in the West Midlands, England

United States
 Rowley, Iowa
 Rowley, Massachusetts
 Rowley (CDP), Massachusetts
 Rowley, Utah
 Rowley Creek, a stream in Wisconsin

People

Surname
 Alec Rowley (1892–1958), English composer
 Alex Rowley (born 1963), Scottish politician
 Arthur Rowley (footballer born 1870), English footballer with Stoke and Port Vale
 Arthur Rowley (1926–2002), English footballer with Fulham, Leicester City and Shrewsbury
 Bartholomew Rowley (1764–1811), British naval officer
 Beth Rowley, English singer-songwriter
 Sir Charles Rowley, 1st Baronet (1770–1845), British naval officer
 Chris Rowley, American baseball pitcher
 Christopher Rowley (born 1948), American writer
 Coleen Rowley, FBI agent and whistleblower before WTC event
 Cynthia Rowley, American fashion designer
 Dick Rowley (1904–1984), Irish international footballer
 Elizabeth Rowley, Canadian politician and writer
 Francis H. Rowley (1852–1954), American Baptist minister, animal welfare campaigner and hymn writer
 Geoff Rowley, Liverpool-born professional skateboarder
 George Rowley (academic) (1782–1836), Dean and Master of University College, Oxford and Vice-Chancellor of Oxford University
 George Rowley (entrepreneur) (born 1964), British entrepreneur
 George Rowley (cricketer) (1896–1953), English cricketer
 George Dawson Rowley (1822–1878), English amateur ornithologist
 Gordon Rowley (1921–2019), British botanist and writer specialising in cacti and succulents
 Graham Westbrook Rowley Arctic explorer and geographer
 H. H. Rowley (1890–1969), English theologian and scholar
 Hazel Rowley, British-born Australian writer
 Ian Rowley, Australian ornithologist
 Jack Rowley, football player
 James Joseph Rowley, director of the United States Secret Service
 Janet Rowley, American human geneticist
 Joshua Rowley (1734–1790), Royal Navy officer
 Josias Rowley (1765–1842), Royal Navy officer
 Katie Rowley Jones, English musical theatre actress
 Keith Rowley (born 1949), Prime Minister of Trinidad and Tobago
 Mark Rowley (born 1964), Commissioner of the Metropolitan Police in London
 Mark Rowley (born 1990), Scottish actor
 Richard Rowley (disambiguation)
 Stan Rowley, Australian sprinter
 Thomas Rowley (disambiguation), several men with this name
 Trevor Rowley, British landscape historian and archaeologist
 William Rowley (disambiguation), several men with this name
 Holders of the title Baron Langford
Clotworthy Rowley, 1st Baron Langford
Geoffrey Alexander Rowley-Conwy, 9th Baron Langford

Given name
 Rowley Birkin QC, fictional character in The Fast Show UK television comedy
 Rowley Jefferson, a fictional character in the Diary of a Wimpy Kid series

Transportation
 Rowley station (MBTA), a commuter rail station in Rowley, Massachusetts, United States
 Rowley railway station (England), a former railway station in Rowley, Durham, England
 , a British frigate in commission in the Royal Navy from 1943 to 1945

Other
 Old Rowley, a racehorse of King Charles II

See also
 Rowly
 Henry Rowley Bishop, English composer
 Rowlan
 Rowland (disambiguation)
 Ó Rothláin

English-language surnames